{{safesubst:#invoke:RfD|||month = March
|day = 20
|year = 2023
|time = 20:13
|timestamp = 20230320201345

|content=
REDIRECT Hrithik Roshan

}}